California's 15th congressional district is a congressional district in the U.S. state of California.

Currently, the district includes most of San Mateo County and the southeast side of San Francisco. Cities in the district include Daly City, South San Francisco, San Bruno, Millbrae, Burlingame, Hillsborough, San Mateo, Foster City, San Carlos, Belmont, Redwood City and East Palo Alto.

Prior to the 2022 United States House of Representatives elections, the district covered most of eastern and southwestern Alameda County as well as part of Contra Costa County. Cities and CDPs in the district included Castro Valley, Dublin, Hayward, Livermore, Pleasanton, Sunol, and Union City; most of San Ramon; and parts of Danville and Fremont. The new 15th district roughly corresponds to the old 14th district and vice versa.

Election results from statewide races

Composition

As of the 2020 redistricting, California's 15th congressional district is part of the San Francisco Bay Area. It encompasses the east coast of San Mateo, which is split between this district and the 16th district. They are partitioned by the San Francisquito Creek, Menalto Ave, Willow Rd, S Perimeter Rd, W Perimeter Rd, Bay Rd, Marsh Rd, Middlefield Rd, Highway 82, Highway 84, Alameda de las Pulgas, Woodhill Dr, Farm Hill Blvd, The Loop Rd, Jefferson Ave, Summit Way, California Way, Junipero Serra Freeway, and Highway 35. The 15th district takes in the cities of San Mateo, Daly City, South San Francisco, Redwood City, Burlingame, San Bruno, Millbrae, East Palo Alto, San Carlos, Foster City, and Belmont, the town of Hillsborough, as well as the census designated place North Fair Oaks.

Along with San Mateo County, the 16th district also takes in the San Francisco neighborhoods of Crocker Amazon, Excelsior, Little Hollywood, Mission Terrace, Oceanview, Outer Mission, Portola, and Visitacion Valley.

Cities & CDP with 10,000 or more people
 San Mateo - 105,661
 Daly City - 104,901 
 Redwood City - 84,292 
 South San Francisco - 66,105
 San Bruno - 43,908
 Foster City - 33,805
 Burlingame - 31,386
 San Carlos - 30,722
 East Palo Alto - 30,034
 Belmont - 28,335
 Millbrae - 23,216
 North Fair Oaks - 14,027
 Hillsborough - 11,387

List of members representing the district

Election results

1932

1934

1936

1938

1940

1942

1944

1946

1948

1950

1952

1954

1956

1958

1960

1962

1964

1966

1968

1970

1972

1974

1976

1978

1980

1982

1984

1986

1988

1989 (Special)

1990

1992

1994

1995 (Special)

1996

1998

2000

2002

2004

2006

2008

2010

2012

2014

2016

2018

2020

2022

See also
 List of United States congressional districts

References

External links

 GovTrack.us: California's 15th congressional district
 RAND California Election Returns: District Definitions
 California Voter Foundation map - CD15

15
Government of Alameda County, California
Fremont, California
Hayward, California
Livermore, California
Pleasanton, California
San Ramon, California
Amador Valley
Constituencies established in 1933
1933 establishments in California